Mats Lusth (born May 20, 1962) is a former ice hockey player and coach. After working as an assistant coach for Malmö Redhawks of the SHL, he was the team's head coach for the 2013–2014 and 2014–15 seasons. As a player, Lusth spent most of his career playing in Elitserien. He has played for Mora IK, Färjestad BK, Malmö Redhawks, GCK Lions of National League B, Leksands IF and Västerås. Lusth has also coached a number of teams including Alleghe Hockey in the Italian Serie A and the Brûleurs de Loups of Grenoble in the French Ligue Magnus.

Career statistics

References

External links

1962 births
Living people
Swedish ice hockey right wingers
Swedish ice hockey coaches
Färjestad BK players
Leksands IF players
Mora IK players
VIK Västerås HK players
People from Gävle
Sportspeople from Gävleborg County